Eusebio Chamorro (born 22 November 1922) was an Argentine football goalkeeper, who played in several Argentine, Brazilian and Colombian top level clubs.

Career
Born in Rosario, Eusebio Chamorro began his career in Newell's Old Boys in 1945. In December 1950 he joined Boca Juniors to play in a Center American tour. Chamorro also defended Independiente Santa Fe of Colombia in 1951, debuting on 15 April in a game against Cúcuta Deportivo. He joined Brazilian club Flamengo in 1953, debuting on 10 September, in a game against XV de Jaú. He left the club in 1956, after winning the Campeonato Carioca in the first year defending the club, and having played 55 games, Before he left the club, he won the Torneio Internacional do Rio de Janeiro in 1955. His last game for Flamengo was played on 10 October 1956, against Bonsucesso. He played for Newell's Old Boys in 1962.

Honors

Club
Flamengo
Campeonato Carioca: 1953
Torneio Internacional do Rio de Janeiro: 1955

References

1922 births
Possibly living people
Argentine footballers
Argentine Primera División players
Categoría Primera A players
Boca Juniors footballers
Independiente Santa Fe footballers
CR Flamengo footballers
Newell's Old Boys footballers
Argentine expatriate footballers
Expatriate footballers in Brazil
Expatriate footballers in Colombia
Argentine expatriate sportspeople in Colombia
Argentine expatriate sportspeople in Brazil
Association football goalkeepers
Footballers from Rosario, Santa Fe